Ugo Pignotti (19 November 1898 – 7 January 1989) was an Italian fencer. He won a gold medal in the team foil event at the 1928 Summer Olympics and two silver medals at the 1932 Summer Olympics.

References

External links
 

1898 births
1989 deaths
Italian male fencers
Olympic fencers of Italy
Fencers at the 1928 Summer Olympics
Fencers at the 1932 Summer Olympics
Olympic gold medalists for Italy
Olympic silver medalists for Italy
Olympic medalists in fencing
Sportspeople from Florence
Medalists at the 1928 Summer Olympics
Medalists at the 1932 Summer Olympics
19th-century Italian people
20th-century Italian people